The grey-olive greenbul (Phyllastrephus cerviniventris), or grey-olive bulbul, is a species of songbird in the bulbul family, Pycnonotidae.  It is found in eastern and south-central Africa.  Its natural habitats are subtropical or tropical dry forests, subtropical or tropical moist lowland forests, and subtropical or tropical moist shrubland.

Taxonomy and systematics

Subspecies
Two subspecies are recognized:
 P. c. schoutedeni - Prigogine, 1969: Found from central Kenya to central Mozambique, Zambia and eastern Angola
 P. c. cerviniventris - Shelley, 1894: Found in Katanga (south-eastern Democratic Republic of the Congo)

References

grey-olive greenbul
grey-olive greenbul
Birds of East Africa
Birds of Southern Africa
grey-olive greenbul
grey-olive greenbul
Taxonomy articles created by Polbot